is a 2000 Japanese historical drama television series and the 39th NHK taiga drama. The series respectively stars Masahiko Tsugawa, Toshiyuki Nishida, and Onoe Tatsunosuke II as the first three Tokugawa shōguns. It aired from January 9 to December 17, 2000, and ran for a total of 49 episodes.

Aoi is the first taiga drama to be fully filmed in high definition.

Plot
The story begins with the battle of Sekigahara.

Cast

Tokugawa Shoguns
Masahiko Tsugawa as Tokugawa Ieyasu - the first shogun of the Tokugawa shogunate
Toshiyuki Nishida as Tokugawa Hidetada - the second shogun
Onoe Tatsunosuke II as Tokugawa Iemitsu - the third shogun
Takayuki Yamada as young Iemitsu

Tokugawa clan
Shima Iwashita as Ogō - wife of Hidetada
Isuzu Yamada as Odai no Kata - mother of Ieyasu
Kyōko Mitsubayashi as Acha no Tsubone
Minako Osanai as Oman no Kata
Michiko Godai as Lady Chaa
Kirin Kiki as Lady Kasuga
Miki Sakai as Tokugawa Masako
Yoko Moriguchi as Okaji no Kata
Nanako Ōkōchi as Senhime
Marika Matsumoto as young Senhime
Fujita Okamoto as Yūki Hideyasu
Hiroyuki Sakamoto as Matsudaira Tadateru
Lie Katō as Irohahime
Hayato Ōshiba as Tokugawa Yorifusa
Manabu Hamada as Hoshina Masayuki
Asumi Nakada as Haruhime
Yukie Nakama as Oraku
Gen Hongō as Tokugawa Yorinobu
Yūtarō Yamamoto as Nagatomimaru
Hideyuki Akabane as Tokugawa Yoshinao
Ryūnosuke Kamiki as Gorōtamaru (young Yoshinao)
Tomoyo Kurosawa as Ichihime

Fudai daimyo
Shigeru Kōyama as Honda Masanobu
Ikkei Watanabe as Honda Masazumi - the eldest son of Masanobu
Joe Shishido as Honda Tadakatsu - one of the Shitennō
Hiroshi Katsuno as Ii Naomasa - one of the Shitennō
Kōji Shimizu as Sakakibara Yasumasa - one of the Shitennō
Taro Ishida as Ōkubo Tadachika
Takashi Sasano as Torii Mototada
Ryūzō Hayashi as Doi Toshikatsu
Mizuho Suzuki as Itakura Katsushige
Masaki Terasoma as Itakura Shigemasa
Hiroshi Iwasaki as Sakai Tadayo
Katsumi Chō as Naitō Kiyonari
Saburo Ishikura as Aoyama Tadatoshi

Toyotomi
Onoe Kikunosuke V as Toyotomi Hideyori
Mayumi Ogawa as Yodo-dono - the second wife of Hideyoshi
Mei Kurokawa as Cha-cha (young Yodo, flashback)
Mitsuko Kusabue as Kōdai-in - the first wife of Hideyoshi
Mayuko Fukuda as Yuihime - the daughter of Hideyori
Nenji Kobayashi as Katagiri Katsumoto
Naoki Hosaka as Ōno Harunaga
Shingo Hiramatsu as Oda Uraku
Teruhiko Saigō as Sanada Yukimura
Hiroshi Hatanaka as Kimura Shigenari
Takayuki Sugō as Konishi Yukinaga
Yoshisada Sakaguchi as Nakamura Kazu'uji

Council of Five Elders
Kazuo Kitamura as Maeda Toshiie
Ken Utsui as Mōri Terumoto
Teruyuki Kagawa as Ukita Hideie
Tsunehiko Kamijō as Uesugi Kagekatsu

Go-Bugyō
Tōru Emori as Ishida Mitsunari
Shinichiro Mikami as Asano Nagamasa
Kei Satō as Mashita Nagamori
Toshio Kurosawa as Natsuka Masaie
Hiroshi Kamiyama as Maeda Gen'i

Ishida family
Masane Tsukayama as Ishida Masazumi
Taketoshi Naito as Ishida Masatsugu
Keiko Takahashi as Orin - wife of Mitsunari
Isao Natsuyagi as Shima Sakon

Eastern Army
Ryō Tamura as Tōdō Takatora
Shinji Yamashita as Kuroda Nagamasa
Shunsuke Kariya as Katō Kiyomasa
Keizō Kanie as Fukushima Masanori
Satoru Saitō as Yamauchi Kazutoyo
Kei Suma as Date Masamune
Hatsunori Hasegawa as Maeda Toshinaga
Tsutomu Isobe as Ikeda Terumasa
Hideaki Tezuka as Tsuda Shigemoto
Hiroyuki Watanabe as Asano Yoshinaga
Shirō Saitō as Tanaka Yoshimasa
Taishi Horikoshi as Sanada Nobuyuki
Naoki Takemura as Miyamoto Musashi

Western Army
Toshiyuki Hosokawa as Ōtani Yoshitsugu
Akaji Maro as Shimazu Yoshihiro
Yūichirō Yamaguchi as Shimazu Toyohisa
Kazuma Suzuki as Kobayakawa Hideaki
Ichirō Zaitsu as Ankokuji Ekei
Osami Nabe as Kikkawa Hiroie
Shinya Ōwada as Tachibana Muneshige

Kyōgoku
Akira Onodera as Kyōgoku Takatsugu
Kuriko Namino as Jōkō-in

Hosokawa
Isao Sasaki as Hosokawa Tadaoki
Kyōka Suzuki as Hosokawa Gracia
Shun Oguri as Hosokawa Tadatoshi

Imperial House
Hiroyuki Kinoshita as Emperor Go-Yōzei
Yasumasa Ōba as Emperor Go-Mizunoo
Minori Terada as Nijō Akizane
Junpei Morita as Sanjōnishi Sane'eda
Noriko Ogawa as Sadako
Aki Maeda as young Sadako
Norihiro Inoue as Kajūji Mitsutoyo
Kazutoyo Yoshimi as Karasumaru Mitsuhiro

Others
Nakamura Baijaku II as Tokugawa Mitsukuni, a.k.a. Mito Kōmon
Kazuyo Asari as Sassa Sukesaburō, a.k.a. Suke-san
Machiko Washio as Asaka Tanpaku, a.k.a. Kaku-san
Terence O'Brien as William Adams, a.k.a. Miura Anjin
Tim Knowles as Richard Cocks
Yatsuko Tan'ami as Kenshō-in, Takeda Shingen's daughter
Natsuko Migiwa as Maeda Matsu
Mikio Shimizu as Oda Nobukatsu
Noriko Shōji as a reporter (herself)
San'yūtei Rakutarō
Ryunosuke Kaneda as Tenkai
Hiroshi Ōkōchi as Konchiin Sūden

Staff
Music : Taro Iwashiro
Historical research : Shinzaburō Ōishi
Architectural research : Kiyoshi Hirai
Clothing research : Kiyoko Koizumi
Sword fight arranger : Kunishirō Hayashi

TV schedule

References

External links
NHK website 

Taiga drama
2000 Japanese television series debuts
2000 Japanese television series endings
Cultural depictions of Date Masamune
Cultural depictions of Tokugawa Ieyasu
Cultural depictions of Tokugawa Iemitsu
Television shows written by James Miki
Television series set in the 16th century
Television series set in the 17th century